Just My Luck is a 1936 American comedy-drama film. Directed by Ray Heinz, the film stars Charles Ray, Anne Grey, and Eddie Nugent. It was released on June 15, 1936.

Cast list
 Charles Ray as the secretary
 Anne Grey as the rich girl
 Eddie Nugent as the son
 Snub Pollard as the secretary's roommate
 Lillian Elliott the landlady
 Quentin R. Smith 
 Lee Prather
 Matthew Betz
 Robert Graves
 John Roche

References

American comedy-drama films
1936 comedy-drama films
American black-and-white films
1936 films
Films directed by Ray Heinz
1930s American films